Behoa (also Besoa) is an Austronesian language spoken in the North Lore district of Central Sulawesi, Indonesia. Together with Napu and Bada, it belongs to the Badaic subgroup. Based on lexical similarity, Behoa occupies an immediate position within Badaic between Napu and Bada; nevertheless it is geographically, politically and culturally distinct.

References

Further reading
 

Kaili–Pamona languages
Languages of Sulawesi